D1X may refer to:

 Nikon D1X, a digital single-lens reflex camera
 a source port of the computer game Descent